Robert Palmer Knight (July 18, 1902 – April 30, 1966) was an American psychoanalyst. He served as the medical director of the Austen Riggs Center from 1947 until his death in 1966.

Early life 
Knight was born on July 18, 1902, in Urbana, Ohio to William James Knight and Florence Dempcy Knight. He graduated from Oberlin College. He earned his medical degree from Northwestern University.

Career 
Knight served his psychiatric residency at the Menninger Clinic. He later became the clinic's chief of staff, and continued to work there until 1947, when he was appointed as medical director of the Austen Riggs Center. During his time there, he dedicated much of his attention to borderline personality disorder. He remained medical director there until his death in 1966.

He served as president of the American Psychoanalytic Association from 1945 to 1946.

Death 
Knight died of lung cancer on April 30, 1966, in Stockbridge, Massachusetts. At the time of his death, he was married to Adele Baroudi Knight, with whom he had two daughters and a son. He also had three sons from a previous marriage. He was buried in Stockbridge Cemetery.

References 

1902 births
1966 deaths
People from Urbana, Ohio
American psychoanalysts
Oberlin College alumni
Northwestern University alumni
Austen Riggs Center physicians